Charise Castro Smith (born August 30, 1983) is an American playwright, actress, screenwriter, producer, and co-director.

Personal life 
Castro Smith is from Miami, Florida, where she was raised in a Cuban American family. She attended Brown University as an undergraduate student and later the Yale School of Drama, where she earned her MFA in acting. Previous to graduate school, she was a city schoolteacher. She lives in LA and is married to actor Joby Earle, whom she met at Yale.

Education 
After receiving her BA from Brown, Castro Smith attended the Yale School of Drama for her Master's in Fine Arts (MFA). Although she was studying acting, she wrote a play Estrella Cruz [the junkyard queen] that was produced at the Yale Cabaret, the student-run theatre. From this, Paula Vogel, head of the playwrighting program at the time, began to act as a mentor to her. After graduating, Castro Smith worked primarily as an actor until she was selected for the Van Lier Fellowship Program in 2012–2013 at the New Dramatists in New York. This led her to embrace playwriting as a career, which led to writing and producing for television.

Career

Artistic inspiration 
Many of Castro Smith's plays are comedic, relationship-focused, and often politically relevant. She notably wants to create more complex, dimensional  roles for women on stage in leading roles. Her plays have been inspired by an eclectic mix of works, such as Shakespeare, South Park, Greek myths, and 1970s horror films.

Playwright career 
In 2008, Castro Smith's first play Estrella Cruz [The Junkyard Queen] was produced at the Yale Cabaret, and was later produced at the Ars Nova ANT Fest in New York City and at the Halcyon Theater in Chicago. The play is a Cuban-American twist of a Greek myth of the goddess Persephone set in the 21st century.

In 2011, Smith's play Boomcracklefly was produced at the Milgaro Theater in Portland, Oregon.

In 2014, her play The Hunchback of Seville was produced by the Washington Ensemble Theatre in Seattle. Acclaimed as a "gleefully revisionist riff on rampaging colonialism," The Hunchback of Seville was inspired by Smith's interest in how Americans handle the history of Columbus and the massacres that resulted from his actions. The complex character of Queen Isabella stems from Smith's own desire to play Richard III in Shakespeare's Richard III.

Smith's most produced work, Feathers and Teeth, was featured at the Goodman Theater's New Stage Festival (2013-2014). Inspired by Hamlet, 1970s horror films, and Jon Ronson's book The Psychopath Test: A Journey Through the Madness Industry, Feathers and Teeth centers on a 13-year-old girl who loses her mom and thinks her new step-mother is a demon. As with Smith's other plays, Feathers and Teeth features a complex, "crazy" female lead in an eccentric and comedic play. Ultimately, Smith's goal was to use horror as a way to help others understand the human experience of obsession and fear. The play was later produced at Artists Repertory Theatre in Portland, Oregon.

In 2017 Castro Smith's work El Huracán, featured at the DNA New Work Series at La Jolla Playhouse, is described as loosely connected to the ideas of Shakespeare's The Tempest.

Television career 
In 2015, Castro Smith made her television writing debut with the Lifetime series Devious Maids. In 2016 she served as both a writer and producer on the Fox television series The Exorcist, as well as writer and co-executive producer of the ABC pilot The Death of Sofia Valdez. In 2018 she went on to serve as writer and supervising producer for the Netflix series The Haunting of Hill House. And in 2019, Castro Smith wrote and co-executive produced the Starz series Sweetbitter.

Films 
Castro Smith made her film debut in a Walt Disney Animation Studios film, titled Encanto, centered on a Colombian girl who lacks magical powers in spite of her family having them. Castro Smith co-directed the film alongside Zootopia co-directors Byron Howard and Jared Bush, and co-wrote the screenplay alongside Bush.

Artist credits

Playwriting credits 
 Estrella Cruz [The Junkyard Queen] (Yale Cabaret (2008) / Ars Nova ANT Fest (2011) / Halcyon Theatre (2016))
 Boomcracklefly (Milagro Theater)
 The Hunchback of Seville (Brown Trinity Playwrights Rep/Washington Ensemble Theatre)
 Feathers and Teeth (Goodman Theater in New Stage Festivals (2013-2014))
 That High Lonesome Sound (Acting Apprentice Company (2014-2015)) [co-writer]
 Washeteria (Soho Rep, one episode (2015)) [co-writer]
 El Huracán (La Jolla Playhouse's DNA New Work Series (2016))

Acting credits 
 Chain of Fools (The Guthrie Theater) (2009)
 Jane Says (The Public Theater: New Work Now!) (2010)
 The Good Wife (2010)
 Body of Proof (2011)
 Unforgettable (2012)
 The Pilgrim & the Private Eye (2012)
 An Enemy of the People (Baltimore Center Stage) (2012)
 Antony and Cleopatra (Royal Shakespeare Company/GableStage/The Public Theater) (2014)
 The Art of Preservation (The Flea Theater)
 The Germ Project (New Georges/ 3LD Arts and Technology Center)
 The Voices in my Head (Ars Nova)

TV producing/writing credits 
 Devious Maids (2015) "Talk of the Town" "The Turning Point"
 The Exorcist (2016) "Chapter Seven: Father of Lies"
 The Death of Eva Sofia Valdez (2016)
 The Haunting of Hill House (2018) 
 Sweetbitter (2019)

Film credits 
 Encanto - 2021 - co-director, story, and screenplay

References

External links 
 

Living people
Writers from Miami
American women dramatists and playwrights
American women television producers
American writers of Cuban descent
Brown University alumni
Hispanic and Latino American dramatists and playwrights
Hispanic and Latino American actresses
Yale School of Drama alumni
21st-century American women writers
21st-century American dramatists and playwrights
21st-century American screenwriters
American women television writers
American television writers
Television producers from Florida
Screenwriters from Florida
Walt Disney Animation Studios people
1983 births